City Montessori School, Aliganj Branch is a private school in Lucknow, India that offers education up to the intermediate level. It is a co-educational, English Medium institution affiliated to CISCE Board, New Delhi established in 1959. The streams offered are Science, Arts, Commerce and Humanities.

History
The school was established by Jagdish Gandhi & Dr. Bharti Gandhi.

Controversies 

 The school was in the headlines during August, 2018, when parents of a girl student of Class 3 accused "boys" of her school molested her over a "Truth and Dare" game. A few protests followed. Later the case was solved without any external legal interference.

References 

Montessori schools in India
Primary schools in Uttar Pradesh
High schools and secondary schools in Uttar Pradesh
Private schools in Lucknow
Educational institutions established in 1959
1959 establishments in Uttar Pradesh